Richard Keith Miller was the founding president of Olin College since 1999. He stepped down from his role as president on June 30, 2020. His successor will be Gilda Barabino, dean of Grove School of Engineering. Previously dean of the College of Engineering and professor at the University of Iowa.
Miller received a B.S. in aerospace engineering in 1971 from the University of California, Davis and an M.S. degree in mechanical engineering from the Massachusetts Institute of Technology in 1972. In 1976, he received a Ph.D. in applied mechanics from the California Institute of Technology.

In 2012, Miller was elected a member of the National Academy of Engineering for establishing a new paradigm for undergraduate engineering education and establishment of Olin College.

Facts
 In 2006, Miller was named one of 12 "All Stars" of the high tech community by Mass High Tech.
 In 2012, he was elected a member of the National Academy of Engineering.

References

External links
 Olin bio
 National Academy of Engineering member page

Heads of universities and colleges in the United States
Living people
Olin College faculty
University of California, Davis alumni
Place of birth missing (living people)
Year of birth missing (living people)
Members of the United States National Academy of Engineering
Fellows of the American Academy of Arts and Sciences
Fellows of the National Academy of Inventors
American university and college faculty deans
University of Southern California faculty
University of California, Santa Barbara faculty
University of Iowa faculty
20th-century American engineers
Engineering academics